Francisco Filinto de Almeida (December 4, 1857 – January 28, 1945) was a Portuguese-born Brazilian dramatist, journalist, and poet.

Biography 
Almeida was born in Porto, Portugal, but was taken to Brazil by relatives at the age of 10 where he lived the rest of his life, dying in Rio de Janeiro. He did not have a formal education, but began his career as a writer at the age of 19. In 1887, he married Júlia Lopes de Almeida, a novelist, in Lisbon. After the establishment of the First Brazilian Republic, he officially took Brazilian citizenship and became a politician. He was the editor of various journals. He wrote drama, poetry, and novels.

Lyrica
A writer who experimented with various poetic genres, he published his first book of poetry in 1887, Lyrica (Lírica), which is notable for the creation of a new verse form, the biolet. The biolet has stimulated at least limited imitation in English.

Other works
Um idioma (entreato cômico – 1876)
Os mosquitos (monólogo em verso – 1887)
O Defunto (comédia teatral em um ato – 1894)
O Gran Galeoto (drama em verso, traduzido em colaboração com  – 1896)
O beijo (comédia em 1 ato, em verso – 1907)
Cantos e cantigas (poesia – 1915)
Camoniana (sonetos – 1945)
Colunas da noite (crônicas – 1945)
Harmonias da noite velha (sonetos – 1946)
A casa verde (romance em colaboração com Júlia Lopes de Almeida, publicado em folhetins do Jornal do Commercio de 18 de dezembro de 1898 a 16 de março de 1899)

References

Further reading
Filinto de Almeida. Lyrica. Typ. Moreira Maximino & C., 1887.
Hikaru Kitabayashi. The Tower of Babylon, A Trioletic Anthology from Various Languages. Lulu Press, 2017. 

1857 births
People from Porto
1945 deaths
19th-century Brazilian novelists
Brazilian male novelists
19th-century Brazilian dramatists and playwrights
Brazilian male dramatists and playwrights
Brazilian male poets
Writers from Rio de Janeiro (city)
Portuguese emigrants to Brazil
19th-century Brazilian poets
19th-century Brazilian male writers
20th-century Brazilian novelists
20th-century Brazilian poets
20th-century Brazilian male writers
20th-century Brazilian dramatists and playwrights